Chiang Hsiao-yen (born 1 March 1942) or John Chiang, formerly surnamed Chang, is a Taiwanese politician affiliated with the Kuomintang. He is the speculated illegitimate son of Chiang Ching-kuo, former leader of the Republic of China, which would make him the grandson of Chiang Kai-shek.

Biography
He and his identical twin brother, Winston Chang, both illegitimate, are believed to have been born the sons of Chiang Ching-kuo and his mistress Chang Ya-juo at public hospital in Guilin. Since they were born out of wedlock, the twins took their mother's surname, Chang, though they were given the Chiang generation name shared by all the grandchildren of Chiang Kai-shek, including Chiang Ching-kuo's legitimate children.

Chang Ya-juo died when the brothers were one year old in August 1942, and they were raised by Chang Ya-juo's younger brother, Chang Hau-juo (章浩若) and his wife Chi Chen (紀琛). Their uncle and aunt were listed as their natural parents on official documents until December 2002, when the true parents were listed. Chou Chin-hua (周錦華), the boys' maternal grandmother, and the 7-year-old brothers moved to Taiwan amid the Chinese Civil War. They were not informed that Chiang Ching-kuo was their father until they were in high school. The Chang brothers went to Soochow University at the same time. John later obtained an M.S. from Georgetown University.

With Helen H. Huang (黃美倫), he has two daughters, Hui-lan (惠蘭) and Hui-yun (惠筠), and a son, Wan-an (萬安). In March 2005, he officially changed his surname to "Chiang", saying, "The change represents a respect for history, a return to the facts, and a realization of my parents' wishes." He also announced that his children would follow suit.

Political career
Chiang began his career in the foreign service, serving in the ROC embassy in Washington, D.C., from 1974 to 1977. In the 1980s, he held various administrative posts in the ROC Foreign Ministry specializing in North American Affairs. He was Administrative Vice Minister from 1986 to 1990, Director General, of the Overseas Affairs Department in 1990, and Political Vice Minister from 1990 to 1993. In 1993 he was appointed to the cabinet-level post of Chairman of the Overseas Chinese Affairs Commission and served as a member of the KMT Central Standing Committee. He was selected a member of the National Assembly in 1996.

He was Foreign Minister from 1996 to 1997, vice premier in 1997, and Secretary-General of the presidential office in 1999. He was speculated as a potential running mate for Lien Chan on the KMT ticket in the 2000 presidential elections until a sex scandal involving a mistress caused him to resign on 22 December 1999. His alleged mistress strenuously denied the allegations, filing suit against the newspaper which had named her.

Chang announced his candidacy for the December 2001 legislative elections in March 2001. One of his opponents in the December 2001 elections was his alleged 1999 mistress, but she received only a fraction of his eventual winning vote count. From 2002 through 2012, he was a member of the Legislative Yuan, first representing the constituency of Taipei City South from 2002 to 2005 and then representing Taipei City North from 2005 through 2012. He served as the Chairman of Interior Affairs Committee while in the legislature.

In January 2006, Chiang declared his candidacy as a KMT candidate for the Taipei Mayor, but withdrew from the race in April, stating he did so for party solidarity.

At the end of March 2007, Chiang staged a rally at the Chiang Kai-shek Memorial Hall in support of his grandfather, late President Chiang Kai-shek. The Memorial hall was later renamed, in a hotly controversial move, by the Executive Yuan, to the National Taiwan Democracy Memorial Hall, striking out the name of Chiang Kai-Shek temporarily; the Memorial's name was restored on 21 August 2008.

In the 2008 Republic of China legislative election, John Chiang won re-election in his district of Taipei City North.

In April 2011, Chiang lost a poll for the Kuomintang legislative candidacy to Lo Shu-lei, a fellow Kuomintang legislator, in the Taipei Zhongshan-Songshan electoral district by a margin of 0.58 percent. The poll was made binding for the KMT nomination and Lo Shu-lei was later elected to the Legislative Yuan.

In March 2015, Chiang's son Wan-an announced his candidacy for the Legislative Yuan in the KMT primary for Taipei's Zhongshan-Songshan district, which put him against Lo Shu-lei and Wang Hung-wei for the KMT nomination. Chiang Wan-an subsequently won the KMT primary in May 2015, quickly gaining name recognition thanks in part to his chats with prospective voters as they waited for garbage trucks. John Chiang's participation in his son's campaign was limited to moral support and babysitting his son's children.

References

1941 births
Living people
Taipei Members of the Legislative Yuan
Kuomintang Members of the Legislative Yuan in Taiwan
Chiang Kai-shek family
Taiwanese twins
Identical twins
Soochow University (Taiwan) alumni
Georgetown University alumni
Taiwanese Ministers of Foreign Affairs
People from Guilin
Republic of China politicians from Guangxi
Members of the 5th Legislative Yuan
Members of the 6th Legislative Yuan
Members of the 7th Legislative Yuan
Children of national leaders of China
Chinese Civil War refugees
Taiwanese people from Guangxi